The 2002 Speedway World Cup Qualification (SWC) was an event of motorcycle speedway meetings used to determine the two national teams who qualify for the 2002 Speedway World Cup. According to the FIM rules the top ten nations from the 2001 Speedway World Cup were automatically qualified.

Results 

 Qualifying round
  Abensberg

Heat details 

 Qualifying round
 20 May 2002
  Abensberg, Motorstadion

References

See also 
 2002 Speedway World Cup

Q